ABC Supply Co., Inc. is a major, private American roofing supply company based in Beloit, Wisconsin.  It also sells windows, gutters, and siding for residential and commercial buildings and is the largest roofing and vinyl siding wholesale distributor in the United States.

History 
The company was founded in 1982 by Ken Hendricks and Diane Hendricks. It grew from a single store in Wisconsin to having over 700 branches in 49 states nationwide and sales of over 11 billion dollars.

ABC Supply has expanded from its original business. In early 2010, the company acquired Bradco Supply, its largest acquisition to date.

Annual sales topped $5.9 billion in 2015, placing it 63rd on Forbes list of largest private companies in the United States.

Following the accidental death of Ken Hendricks on December 21, 2007, company president David Luck was named CEO. Luck retired on December 31, 2013, and was replaced by Keith Rozolis.

In May 2020, one of the company's property locations was among those damaged by arson during the George Floyd protests in Minneapolis–Saint Paul.

Awards and honors 
The company has won the Gallup Great Workplace Award for the eleven consecutive years, from 2007 to 2017.

Corporate sponsorship 
It sponsors A. J. Foyt Enterprises' #14 and #4 IndyCar Series cars.

ABC Supply holds the naming rights for the upcoming ABC Supply Stadium; it is planned to be the new home field of the Beloit Snappers.

Politics
Diane Hendricks is a megadonor to conservative and Republican causes. She was among the 10 largest individual contributors to Donald Trump during the 2020 United States elections.

References

Beloit, Wisconsin
Companies based in Wisconsin
Business services companies established in 1982
Building materials companies of the United States
Privately held companies based in Wisconsin
1982 establishments in Wisconsin
Retail companies established in 1982